The Albania national rugby team is the representative of  Albania in the rugby union. It was established on 6 February 2010 in Pordenone. The team's first international participation was at the "Alpe, Adria and Balkans Cup" on June 11, 2011 placing 6th.

See also
 Rugby union in Albania

References

Rugby union
European national rugby union teams
Rugby union in Albania